Haakon Forsell Hjelde (February 12, 1902 – December 10, 1933) was a Norwegian actor. He also worked as a director's assistant and production manager's assistant. As a young man, he traveled to Berlin and then to Paris, where he lived and starred in several French films. He died of tuberculosis at age 31.

Family
Hjelde was born in Eidsvoll, Norway, the son of the veterinarian Baard Arne Hjelde (1872–1935) and Alma Forsell Jensen (1871–1918). He married the Swedish dancer Maina Claes in 1929.

Filmography

1926: Den nye lensmannen as Franz Joseph, a Gypsy
1926: Simen Mustrøens besynderlige opplevelser as Helge Hjort, the district judge 
1927: Fjeldeventyret as Wilhelm, a student 
1927: Syv dage for Elisabeth as Rolf Heller
1930: Eskimo as Majrak, a great hunter 
1932: Halvvägs till himlen as Ned Lee

References

External links
 
 Haakon Hjelde at Filmfront
 Haakon Hjelde at the Swedish Film Database
 Haakon Hjelde at the Danish Film Database

1902 births
1933 deaths
20th-century Norwegian male actors
People from Eidsvoll